The Fellowship of Christian Councils in Southern Africa (FOCCISA) is an international ecumenical organization. Founded in 1980 as the Fellowship of Christian Councils in East and Southern Africa, it changed to its current name in 1999. It is a member of the World Council of Churches. FOCCISA members include:

 Botswana Council of Churches
 Christian Council of Lesotho
 Christian Council of Mozambique
 Christian Council of Tanzania
 Council of Christian Churches in Angola
 Council of Churches in Namibia
 Council of Churches in Zambia
 Council of Swaziland Churches
 Malawi Council of Churches
 National Council of Churches of Kenya
 South African Council of Churches
 Zimbabwe Council of Churches

External links 

Economic Justice Network of FOCCISA
World Council of Churches listing

Christian organizations established in 1980
Members of the World Council of Churches
Christian organizations based in Africa
Regional councils of churches